β-Isophorone is an organic compound with the formula (CH3)3C6H7O.  Classified as a β,γ-unsaturated ketone, it is an isomer of and common impurity in the major industrial intermediate α-isophorone, which is produced from acetone. Like the alpha isomer, beta-isophorone is a colorless liquid.

See also
Phorone

References

Ketones
Ketone solvents
Cyclohexenes